Lyudmila Arkadzieuna Ananko (born 19 April 1982) is a Belarusian biathlete. She competed at the 2002 Winter Olympics and the 2006 Winter Olympics.

References

External links

1982 births
Living people
Biathletes at the 2002 Winter Olympics
Biathletes at the 2006 Winter Olympics
Belarusian female biathletes
Olympic biathletes of Belarus
People from Navahrudak
Sportspeople from Grodno Region